Acer sycopseoides is an Asian species of maple. It is native to China (Guangxi, Guizhou, Yunnan).

Acer sycopseoides is a small tree up to 6 meters tall with gray bark. Leaves are non-compound, up to 8 cm wide and 4 cm across, thick and leathery, with a 1-2 short, shallow lobes along the edges.

References

External links
line drawing for Flora of China drawings 3 at lower left

sycopseoides
Plants described in 1932
Flora of China